Louis of Hesse-Philippsthal (German: Ludwig von Hessen-Philippsthal; 8 October 1766 – 15 February 1816) was a German nobleman and a general. He fought for the Kingdom of Naples (later Kingdom of the Two Sicilies).  From 1813 until his death, he was the ruling Landgrave of Hesse-Philippsthal.

Biography
Louis was born at Philippsthal as the son of William, Landgrave of Hesse-Philippsthal and his wife Princess Ulrike Eleonora of Hesse-Philippsthal-Barchfeld.

A prince of the family of the Landgraves of Hesse-Philippsthal, he fought for the Kingdom of Naples during the Napoleonic Wars. In the course of the War of the Third Coalition, he commanded the garrison of the fortress of Gaeta in the siege laid by the French in 1806, refusing to obey the order of the Neapolitan government to surrender it. His troops resisted for six months, until 18 July after Louis, while leading his men on the bastions, was wounded on 10 July and had to leave the fortress.

Later, together with colonel Nunziante and lieutenant colonel Bardot, an expedition of 4,000 men who, in 1807, left Sicily to attempt the reconquest of the mainland of Naples. They were however defeated in the Battle of Mileto of 28 May 1807.

After the death of his brother Charles in the siege of Frankfurt in 1793, Louis succeeded him as hereditary prince of the langraviate of Hesse-Philippsthal. When Louis died childless at Naples in 1816 (his only son had died in 1802, aged four), the title went to his brother Ernst Konstantin.

Marriage and issue 
Louis married on 21 January 1791 in Susteren to Countess Marie Franziska Berghe von Trips (1771-1805), daughter of Count Franz Adolph Berghe von Trips (1732-1799) and Eleonore Kunigunde von Rathsamhausen (1747-1783). His parents were unaware of this marriage and didn't recognize when they learned about it.  Moreover, he had to resign from the Dutch army, as officers were not allowed to marry Catholics.  Marie Franziska had connections, and managed to get her husband a position in the army of the Kingdom of Naples.  She served as Mistress of the Robes at the court of Queen Maria Carolina.

Louis and Marie Franziska had two children:
 Caroline (1793–1872), married in 1810 to Count Ferdinand de la Ville sur Illon (d. 1865), divorced 1814
 William (1798-1802)

Ancestors

Sources

1776 births
1816 deaths
People from Hersfeld-Rotenburg
Landgraves of Hesse
German military personnel of the Napoleonic Wars